Operation MacArthur (later renamed Operation Binh Tay–MacArthur) was a United States Army military operation in the Central Highlands of South Vietnam from 12 October 1967 to 31 January 1969. The early phases of the operation encompassed the Battle of Dak To from 3 to 23 November 1967.

Background

The U.S. 4th Infantry Division was responsible for the defense of the provincial and district capitals that lay along Highway 14, a paved road that ran from north to south through the middle of the Central Highlands.

Opposing the 4th Infantry Division was PAVN General Hoàng Minh Thảo’s B3 Front, a headquarters that controlled all the main force units in the South Vietnamese provinces of Kontum, Pleiku and Darlac, as well as the western portions of Bình Định and Phu Bon Provinces. Thao’s main combat force, the 1st Division, contained three strong regiments, the 32nd, the 66th, and the 174th, and was commanded by a veteran officer, Colonel Nguyễn Hữu An. The B3 Front commander also controlled three independent regiments, the 24th Regiment based in Kontum Province, the 95B Regiment in Pleiku Province and the 33rd Regiment in Darlac Province. Thao’s long-range striking power came from the 40th PAVN Artillery Regiment, armed with 122mm rockets, 120mm mortars, and 75mm recoilless rifles. The enemy received his supplies and replacements from several large bases on the Cambodian border, which lay at the southern end of the Ho Chi Minh Trail.

As October 1967 drew to a close, I Field Force, Vietnam commander General William B. Rosson’s most pressing concern in the Central Highlands was the ominous sign of an offensive buildup by elements of the B3 Front. Rosson believed that the most likely targets were the Civilian Irregular Defense Group program (CIDG) camps and other installations in western Kontum and Pleiku Provinces that were within easy reach of the enemy’s Cambodian base and Đắk Tô was at the top of the list.

Operation

October-December
The initial phases of the operation became the Battle of Dak To from 3 to 23 November 1967.

January 1968
On 15 January a PAVN/VC force ambushed a 40 vehicle convoy 40km west of An Khê using three command-detonated mines, small arms and Rocket-propelled grenades (RPGs), Division reaction force and convoy security elements broke up the attack killing 13 PAVN/VC. For his actions in this battle Specialist Five Dwight H. Johnson would be awarded the Medal of Honor. On 20 January two companies from the 1st Brigade received 75mm recoilless rifle fire 15km west of Đắk Tô and returned fire supported by artillery and helicopter gunships killing 23 PAVN/VC. On 23 January a unit of the 2nd Brigade found a weapons cache 17km west of Pleiku containing one individual and two crew-served weapons, 25 mines and three RPG-2 grenades. On 26 January at 09:30 a unit of the 1st Brigade engaged an enemy force 17km northwest of Đắk Tô supported by artillery, helicopter gunships and airstrikes killing 14 PAVN/VC; U.S. losses were four killed.

Cumulative operational results to the end of January were 1,703 PAVN/VC killed and 376 individual and 106 crew-served weapons captured. U.S. losses were 359 killed.

February
On 13 February a Division company supported by artillery and helicopter gunships engaged an enemy platoon 15km northwest of Đắk Tô, the enemy withdrew at 13:00 leaving 12 dead. On 23 February a unit of the Division’s air cavalry squadron supported by helicopter gunships engaged two enemy companies killing 23. On 25 February helicopter gunships attacked ten PAVN/VC, killing all ten. On 26 February at 08:45 as a Division unit was being air-assaulted into a landing zone 19km west-northwest of Đắk Tô they came under fire and one helicopter made an emergency landing. The other helicopters diverted to an alternative landing zone and linked up with the downed helicopter at 12:15. PAVN/VC losses were 21 killed while U.S. losses were one killed. On 27 February at 08:00 a unit of the 25th Infantry Division in a night defensive position were hot by mortar fire followed by a ground assault. The unit returned fire supported by artillery, helicopter gunships and airstrikes and the enemy withdrew at 19:30 leaving 69 dead.

Cumulative operational results to the end of February were 2,806 PAVN/VC killed and 578 individual and 129 crew-served weapons captured. U.S. losses were 463 killed.

March
The new Division commander Major General Charles P. Stone used reconnaissance patrols from the Division and CIDG teams to watch the dozens of trails that led into Laos and Cambodia supported by scout planes and helicopters. An enemy force discovered by any of those means would face a gauntlet of air and artillery strikes and then a swarm of helicopter-backed infantry if they came within striking distance of one of the few towns that dotted the highlands. General Stone felt he could afford to let the enemy come to him because, as he put it, "I have everything the enemy wants and he has nothing I want."

In early March, U.S. forces were distributed evenly across Kontum, Pleiku and Darlac Provinces. The 1st and 2nd Battalions of the 503rd Infantry Regiment, 173rd Airborne Brigade, were looking for the 33rd Regiment near Ban Me Thuot, although it now appeared that the enemy had retreated far to the southwest to rest and refit. The 2nd Brigade guarded Pleiku Province, aware that the 32nd Regiment had recently moved somewhere southwest of the provincial capital. The 1st Brigade had an even greater responsibility in Kontum Province, for it had to monitor the 24th Regiment that was somewhere north of Kontum city as well as the 66th and 174th Regiments that were in the Đắk Tô area. While General Stone and the new I Field Force commander General Peers doubted the B3 Front would initiate another major offensive in the next few months—partly because of its Tet Offensive losses and partly because of the seasonal onset of the rains of the southwest monsoon—they expected the enemy to seek small gains whenever he could.

After Tet, the commander of the B3 Front, General Thao, decided to shift his main focus away from Đắk Tô. While he would continue to threaten the allied bases there, he believed the thickening defenses between Ben Het Camp and Tân Cảnh Base Camp had substantially reduced his chances for success. By contrast, areas to the south were less well protected and thus offered a greater opportunity to pick off an isolated base or to ambush an unwary unit. The CIDG camps at Plei Kleng, 22km west of Kontum and Plei Mrong, 30km southwest of the capital, were especially enticing targets because they were lightly defended with little or no road access to the main allied bases. All the while, Thao would continue to restock his forward supply areas and to integrate replacements coming down the Ho Chi Minh Trail in anticipation of the next major phase of the 1968 general offensive. 

The allies learned more about Thao’s intentions on 1 March when the commander of the 9th Battalion, 66th Regiment, Vu Nhu Y, turned himself in and spoke at length to allied interrogators. He explained that the post-Tet mission of the 1st Division was to draw allied units into the region in order to create opportunities for PAVN/VC units elsewhere in the country. The division and elements of the 40th Artillery Regiment would continue to harass Ben Het and Đắk Tô with indirect fire, while the 66th Regiment looked for opportunities to assault outposts. The same was true for the 174th Regiment. The North Vietnamese officer admitted that the 1st Division still had not fully recovered from the Đắk Tô campaign, even though it had recently obtained a fresh regiment, the 320th, to replace the battered 32nd, which had moved south to Darlac Province to operate under front control with the 33rd Regiment. The 320th Regiment, formerly the 209th Regiment, 312th Division, had just arrived from North Vietnam and was near full strength. General Thao could also reinforce an attack along Route 512 with the independent 24th Regiment if the need arose.

On 3 March at 18:00 a Division unit was attacked by fire 28km northwest of Pleiku and returned fire supported by helicopter gunships killing 15 PAVN/VC. On 4 March at 16:00 a unit of the 3rd Brigade searching a village 15km southeast of Pleiku engaged 40-50 VC. The unit was supported by helicopter gunships and airstrikes and the VC withdrew after three hours leaving 30 dead. On 8 March at 09:25 the 7th Squadron, 17th Cavalry Regiment engaged an enemy force 25km south of Đắk Tô, two more troops joined the battle at 15:00 and the enemy withdrew at 19:00 leaving 14 dead; U.S. losses were one killed. On 16 March at 10:30 a unit of the 173rd Airborne Brigade engaged an enemy force 18km north-northwest of Kontum. The enemy withdrew at 12:40, but was reengaged at 15:30 until the enemy withdrew at nightfall leaving 50 dead; U.S. losses were one killed. On 17 March at 17:10 a unit of the 173rd Airborne in a night defensive position 19km northwest of Kontum received fire and the unit returned fire supported by artillery forcing the enemy to withdraw.

On 26 March two battalions of the 320th Regiment attacked Firebase 14. Companies A and B of the 3rd Battalion, 8th Infantry Regiment, had established the outpost a few days earlier to protect the Polei Kleng Camp 12km to the east. Employing flamethrowers in addition to automatic weapons and RPG-2s, the PAVN penetrated the northwest perimeter and briefly occupied a few bunkers until driven off by a U.S. counterattack. 135 PAVN and 19 U.S. were killed in the fighting. On 30 March the 173rd Airborne Brigade flew to Bình Định Province to swap places with the 3rd Brigade, 4th Infantry Division, bringing all three brigades of the Division together for the first time in the war.

April
Beginning on 1 April and continuing for eight days, PAVN gunners fired some 400 mortar and recoilless rifle rounds into Firebase 14, which the 3/8th Infantry, had relinquished to the 1st Battalion, 35th Infantry Regiment. On 5 April, Companies A, B and C from the 35th Infantry Regiment encountered a battalion from the PAVN 320th Regiment west of the base and killed 48 PAVN before they broke contact; U.S. losses were one killed. On 15 April at 13:00 Company C, 1/35th Infantry was attacked by fire west of Firebase 14, the unit returned fire and was supported by artillery and airstrikes and reinforced by a unit of the 1st Brigade. The enemy withdrew leaving 12 dead; U.S. losses were nine killed.

The sudden spike in activity around Firebase 14 came into clearer focus on 20 April. A pair of PAVN deserters told their interrogators that the B3 Front was trying to strengthen its infiltration and supply routes that led from the tri-border area to the central plateau where the major cities were located. General Stone responded to this report by establishing a second outpost a short distance to the west of Firebase 14 manned by elements of the 1st Battalion, 14th Infantry Regiment and the 1st Battalion, 22nd Infantry Regiment. Like Firebase 14, it was situated on a key piece of terrain that overlooked the surrounding area. 

The unit was reinforced by helicopter gunships and airstrikes which caused two secondary explosions. The enemy withdrew at 15:20 leaving eight dead; U.S. losses were two killed. An hour later another unit engaged an enemy bunkers complex in the area and contact continued until nightfall when the enemy withdrew leaving nine dead; U.S. losses were nine killed. On 28 April at 09:40 a Division unit engaged an entrenched enemy force 25 miles west of Kontum, the unit withdrew and artillery and airstrikes were directed onto the bunkers, the unit continued to receive mortar fire until 19:05; U.S. losses were five killed. On 29 April the PAVN sent a battalion to attack the new firebase on 29 April, but the defenders, Company B of the 1/14th Infantry, turned back the assault and killed 46 PAVN; U.S. losses were two killed. As long as Stone controlled the high ground west of Kontum, the PAVN/VC would find it difficult to mass his forces to attack the provincial capital.

During April the PAVN 325C Division commanded by, Senior Colonel Chu Phuong Doi, minus its 29th Regiment, which it had left behind in northern Quảng Trị Province, arrived in Kontum province. Scout helicopters from the 7/17th Cavalry, noticed a rise in enemy activity around Dak To in early April as the 95C and the 101D Regiments moved into the area. In the meantime, the PAVN 1st Division shifted south toward the Kontum-Pleiku border where it was better positioned to threaten the respective provincial capitals.

Cumulative operational results to the end of April were 4,162 PAVN/VC killed and 845 individual and 135 crew-served weapons captured. U.S. losses were 601 killed.

May
The enemy withdrew at 15:40 leaving 12 dead; U.S. losses were one killed. Tanks from the ARVN 3rd Armored Cavalry Regiment engaged the ambushers and were joined by mechanized infantry, Vietnamese Rangers and CIDG troops. The enemy withdrew at 14:30 leaving 121 dead; U.S. losses were 12 killed. On 16 May near Landing Zone Brillo Pad Sergeant Anund C. Roark smothered the blast of an enemy hand grenade with his body an action for which he was posthumously awarded the Medal of Honor.

The unit counterattacked and recaptured the positions before the enemy withdrew leaving two captured from the 2nd Battalion, 101D Regiment, 325C Division and 51 individual weapons; U.S. losses were 14 killed. A Division unit found 11 PAVN/VC dead 8 miles west-northwest of Đắk Tô. On 31 May a unit of the 3rd Brigade found 14 PAVN/VC dead 19 miles west of Kontum all were killed by artillery or airstrikes. Landing Zone Brillo Pad was hit by mortar and recoilless rifle fire and a ground probe resulting in one PAVN/VC and three U.S. killed.

Cumulative operational results to the end of May were 4,719 PAVN/VC killed and 1,013 individual and 141 crew-served weapons captured. U.S. losses were 690 killed.

June
In June June, General Peers had given expression to MACV policy by ordering that all I Field Force operations be given a Vietnamese name as well as an English name to emphasize the importance of combined activities. Thus, Operation MacArthur became Operation Binh Tay–MacArthur. 

On 3 June between 20:45 and 22:25 a unit of the 1st Brigade in a night defensive position was hit by mortar and small arms fire resulting in three U.S. killed. On 4 June a convoy on Highway 14 to Đắk Tô was ambushed, the ARVN 3rd Armored Cavalry Regiment supported by helicopter gunships drove off the attackers killing 13 PAVN and capturing 31 individual weapons; U.S. losses were one killed. On 7 June during a firefight near Kontum Private first class Phill G. McDonald would be killed while evacuating wounded soldiers, actions for which he was posthumously awarded the Medal of Honor.

Cumulative operational results to the end of June were 4,944 PAVN/VC killed and 1,101 individual and 147 crew-served weapons captured. U.S. losses were 728 killed.

July
Cumulative operational results to the end of July were 5,020 PAVN/VC killed and 1,119 individual and 166 crew-served weapons captured. U.S. losses were 749 killed.

August
On 22 August at 17:15 Firebases 1 and 6 near Đắk Tô were hit by rocket and recoilless rifle fire.

Cumulative operational results to the end of August were 5,176 PAVN/VC killed and 1,177 individual and 183 crew-served weapons captured. U.S. losses were 791 killed.

September
The RF troops were supported by a unit of the air cavalry squadron killing 47 PAVN/VC. On 25 September at 09:30 a company from the 2nd Brigade patrolling 3 miles southwest of Duc Lap was attacked by an enemy company, the battle continued for an hour before the enemy withdrew leaving 35 dead and ten individual and two crew-served weapons; U.S. losses were three killed.

Cumulative operational results to the end of September were 5,402 PAVN/VC killed and 1,246 individual and 185 crew-served weapons captured. U.S. losses were 847 killed.

October
Later that day in the same area another unit found another eight graves, all had been killed by artillery fire two weeks previously. Air cavalry troops were landed in the area and found 11 PAVN dead. While sweeping the surrounding area the troops engaged a PAVN force and as the battle continued they were reinforced at 16:00 by a mechanized unit of the 2nd Brigade. At 16:45 an OH-6 Cayuse light observation helicopter was shot down. The PAVN withdrew at 18:45 leaving 37 dead and three individual and six drew-served weapons; U.S. losses were two killed.

Cumulative operational results to the end of October were 5,494 PAVN/VC killed and 1,261 individual and 194 crew-served weapons captured. U.S. losses were 888 killed.

November
On 4 November at 20:00 a 1st Brigade firebase 9 miles northwest of Đắk Tô was hit by 15 122mm rockets causing minimal damage. On 13 November at 02:25 Camp Holloway and its surrounding area were hit by 20 122mm rockets causing minimal damage. Artillery, helicopter gunships and an AC-47 Spooky gunship fired on the firing position.

Cumulative operational results to the end of November were 5,574 PAVN/VC killed and 1,284 individual and 194 crew-served weapons captured. U.S. losses were 915 killed.

December

Cumulative operational results to the end of December were 5,612 PAVN/VC killed and 1,299 individual and 194 crew-served weapons captured. U.S. losses were 921 killed.

Aftermath
The operation concluded on 31 January 1969. PAVN/VC losses were 5,731 killed and 1,383 individual and 194 crew-served weapons captured. U.S. losses were 955 killed.

References

1967 in Vietnam
1968 in Vietnam
1969 in Vietnam
Battles and operations of the Vietnam War in 1967
Battles and operations of the Vietnam War in 1968
Battles and operations of the Vietnam War in 1969
Battles and operations of the Vietnam War
Battles involving the United States
Battles involving Vietnam
History of Bình Định province
History of Đắk Lắk Province
History of Gia Lai Province
History of Kon Tum Province